The 47th New Brunswick Legislative Assembly represented New Brunswick between March 2, 1971, and October 11, 1974.

Wallace Samuel Bird was Lieutenant-Governor of New Brunswick in 1971. In October of that year, he was succeeded by Hédard Joseph Robichaud.

Lawrence Garvie was chosen as speaker in 1971. William J. Woodroffe became speaker in 1973.

The Progressive Conservative Party led by Richard Hatfield defeated the Liberals to form the government.

History

Members 

Notes:

References 
 Canadian Parliamentary Guide, 1974, PG Normandin

Terms of the New Brunswick Legislature
1970 establishments in New Brunswick
1974 disestablishments in New Brunswick
20th century in New Brunswick